The John Morgan House (also known as The Colonial Cottage) is a historic house in Heflin, Alabama.  The house was built circa 1880 by John Francis and Louise Perryman Morgan, on land given to John for his service in the Mexican–American War.  After Heflin was incorporated in 1892, Morgan was elected its first mayor.

The house originally featured two rooms and a central hall.  It was expanded around 1900, adding 13 rooms, a second floor, and a wraparound porch.  The upper floor features twin gable-fronted dormers and gives the house its Victorian Cottage appearance. The sides of the porch were removed and a 16th room was added on the second story in 1933.

It was listed on the Alabama Register of Landmarks and Heritage in 1991 and the National Register of Historic Places in 1993.

References

National Register of Historic Places in Cleburne County, Alabama
Properties on the Alabama Register of Landmarks and Heritage
Houses completed in 1880
Buildings and structures in Cleburne County, Alabama
Houses on the National Register of Historic Places in Alabama
Houses in Cleburne County, Alabama